East Coast Vijayan is an Indian film producer, director and lyricist who works in Malayalam language. 
Being a lyricist, Vijayan wrote the music album Ninakkai, which was released in 1998. The music was given by Balabhaskar and the song Ninakkay Thozhi Punarjanikkam was sung by Biju Narayanan. In 1999, Vijayan came up with his second album in the Ninakkai series named Aadhyamai, composed by Balabhaskar and penned by Vijayan. In 2001, East Coast came up with Ormakkai. The song "Ormakkai Iniyoru Snehageetham" from the album was composed by M. Jayachandran, written by Vijayan and sung by K. J. Yesudas and K. S. Chithra.

In 2008 Vijayan directed and produced his first movie, Novel. In 2011 he directed and produceded his second movie, Mohabbath. In 2012 he produced his third movie, My Boss.

Albums
Ninakkai (1998)
Aadhyamai (1999)
Ormakkai (2001)
Campus (2002)
Swantham (2002)
Iniennum (2004)
Ennennum (2010)
Entrantrum (Tamil)
Ennadiki (Telugu)
Endendhu (Kannada)
Sada (Hindi)

Filmography

References

External links
 East Coast Vijayan official site

Living people
Indian lyricists
Year of birth missing (living people)
Malayalam film producers
Film producers from Kerala
Film directors from Kerala